Lannon stone is a type of buff-colored, blocky, sedimentary Dolomite (rock), that's name is derived from Mr. William Lannon, one of the original settlers of the Village of Lannon, Wisconsin. Lannon stone can be found throughout the Niagara Escarpment, which runs underneath much of the Great Lakes. Lannon stone is known for its durability and is used in the construction of houses and businesses, both for the structural integrity it brings and the aesthetically pleasing stone façade.  Lannon stone is found heavily throughout southeast Wisconsin in modern constructions either as exterior wall material, stone façade, or ornamental landscaping decorations.

History 
In 1855, it was reported that at least a dozen quarries were shipping Lannon stone to Milwaukee by team and wagon, mainly to be used for paving stones. By the early 1890s, 14 quarries were producing Lannon stone attracting the attention of builders, architects to be used in projects such as paving, kilns, and most notably solid stone-wall buildings.  However, after World War II the industry changed and the attraction to Lannon stone quickly transitioned into being desired as an ornamental landscaping rock, or as thin stone veneer façade.

Durability 
Lannon stone was a popular choice for home construction due to its uniform grade, hardness and color.

References 

Limestone